Massi is an Italian surname. Notable people with the surname include:

 Charles Massi (1952–2010), Central African politician
 Elisabeth Massi Fritz (born 1967), Swedish lawyer
 Emidio Massi (1922–2016), Italian politician
 Enrico Massi (1897-1923), Italian aviator
 Jeri Massi (born 1960), American author
 Maria Massi Dakake, Islamic intellectual history scholar and professor at the George Mason University
 Nick Massi (1927–2000), American singer
 Riccardo Massi, Italian operatic tenor
 Robert Massi (born 1987), Swedish footballer
 Rodolfo Massi (born 1965), Italian cyclist
 Souad Massi (born 1972), Algerian singer
 Stelvio Massi (1929–2004), Italian film director
 Valentina Massi (born 1983), Italian model

Italian-language surnames